H. Lynn Jondahl (born 10 July 1936) was a Democratic member of the Michigan House of Representatives, representing an area near the state capital, Lansing, for two decades.

A native of Iowa, Jondahl earned a bachelor's degree in history at the University of Iowa in 1958 and a master's in divinity from Yale in 1962. He is an ordained minister in the United Church of Christ. Jondahl was a candidate for Governor of Michigan in 1994, and led Governor Jennifer Granholm's transition team in 2002. While he was considered a liberal during his time in the House, Jondahl considered himself a Republican until Barry Goldwater ran for president in 1964. Jondahl served on the State Board of Ethics from 2003 through 2011.

References

1936 births
Living people
Democratic Party members of the Michigan House of Representatives
University of Iowa alumni
Yale Divinity School alumni
People from Emmetsburg, Iowa
United Church of Christ ministers
20th-century American politicians